Dominic Bradley (Irish Doiminic Ó Brolcháin ) is an Irish former Social Democratic and Labour Party (SDLP) politician who was a  Member of the Legislative Assembly (MLA) for Newry and Armagh from 2003 to 2016. As an MLA, he was the SDLP Spokesperson for Education and for the Irish language.

A graduate of St. Paul's High School, Bessbrook, Bradley is a teacher from County Armagh. He acted as Director of Elections for Seamus Mallon MP and for the SDLP in the Newry and Mourne District Council area.

Membership:
 Member of the National Executive Association for School's Drama 
 Founder of Tí Chulainn Cultural Activity Centre, An Mullach Bán. 
 Member of National Executive National Association of Teachers of Irish.

Bradley is an Irish language speaker, and is education editor of the daily newspaper Lá Nua. He writes in Irish for a number of other newspapers. In October 2011, he was sanctioned by speaker for talking too long without asking a question.

Education
He studied at Queen's University, Belfast for a joint honours degree in English Literature and Language. After his degree he stayed on at Belfast and studied for a Postgraduate Certificate in Education. As a mature student he went to the University of Ulster where he studied for and attained a master's degree in Irish Language and Literature.

References

External links
 Bradley on the SDLP website

1960 births
Living people
People from Bessbrook
Social Democratic and Labour Party MLAs
Alumni of Ulster University
Alumni of Queen's University Belfast
Northern Ireland MLAs 2003–2007
Northern Ireland MLAs 2007–2011
Northern Ireland MLAs 2011–2016
Members of Newry and Mourne District Council
Educators from Northern Ireland
People educated at St Paul's High School, Bessbrook
20th-century educators from Northern Ireland